The Festival de Música de Alicante (Alicante Music Festival), formerly known as Festival Internacional de Música Contemporánea de Alicante, is a Spanish annual contemporary classical music festival taking place every autumn, usually in September, in Alicante. First held in 1985, it is currently organized by the Centro Nacional de Difusión Musical (National Center for Music's Diffusion), a branch of the Spanish Ministry of Culture's Instituto Nacional de las Artes Escénicas y de la Música (National Institute of Scenic Arts and Music). It currently has a budget of €485,000, following a 17% budget cut in 2012 due to the ongoing Spanish financial crisis.

Premieres

2012

References

Music festivals in Spain
Contemporary music organizations